With Billie in Mind is a solo tribute album by pianist Teddy Wilson featuring tunes associated with Billie Holiday that were recorded in New York City in 1972 and released on the Chiaroscuro label. The album was reissued on CD in 1990 with six additional tracks.

Reception

Scott Yanow of AllMusic states, "Producer Hank O'Neal suggested to the veteran swing pianist Teddy Wilson that he record a set of Billie Holiday tunes since "Lady Day" had cut many of her greatest sides with Wilson in the 1930s. T... Wilson, who is in peak form, clearly enjoyed playing several tunes that he had not performed in years, and he is heard at the top of his game. Classic swing music".

Track listing
 "What a Little Moonlight Can Do" (Harry Woods) – 4:00
 "This Year's Kisses" (Irving Berlin) – 3:29
 "When You're Smiling" (Larry Shay, Mark Fisher, Joe Goodwin) – 2:12
 "Easy to Love" (Cole Porter) – 3:14
 "Sugar" (Maceo Pinkard, Edna Alexander, Sidney Mitchell) – 3:07
 "Body and Soul" (Johnny Green, Frank Eyton, Edward Heyman, Robert Sour) – 3:30
 "If You Were Mine" (Matty Malneck, Johnny Mercer) – 3:12
 "Them There Eyes" (Pinkard, Doris Tauber, William Tracey) – 2:26
 "I'll Never Be the Same" (Malneck, Frank Signorelli, Gus Kahn) – 3:49		
 "I Wished on the Moon" (Ralph Rainger, Dorothy Parker) – 3:33		
 "Why Was I Born?" (Jerome Kern, Oscar Hammerstein II) – 3:45		
 "I Cried for You" (Gus Arnheim, Abe Lyman, Arthur Freed) – 3:31 Additional track on CD reissue
 "If Dreams Come True" (Benny Goodman, Edgar Sampson, Irving Mills) – 2:33 Additional track on CD reissue
 "Fooling Myself" (Peter Tinturin, Jack Lawrence) – 3:10 Additional track on CD reissue
 "Mean to Me" (Fred E. Ahlert, Roy Turk) – 3:21 Additional track on CD reissue
 "Nice Work If You Can Get It" (George Gershwin, Ira Gershwin) – 2:32 Additional track on CD reissue
 "I'll Get By (As Long as I Have You)" (Ahlert, Turk) – 3:10 Additional track on CD reissue
 "Easy Living" (Ralph Rainger, Leo Robin) – 2:31
 "Miss Brown to You" (Richard A. Whiting, Rainger, Robin) – 3:07
 "What a Moon, What a Night, What a Girl" (John Jacob Loeb) – 3:00

Personnel
Teddy Wilson – piano

References

Teddy Wilson albums
1972 albums
Chiaroscuro Records albums
Billie Holiday tribute albums